The fire belly newt  or fire newt is a genus (Cynops) of newts native to Japan and China. All of the species show bright yellow or red bellies, but this feature is not unique to this genus. Their skin contains a toxin that can be harmful if ingested.

Species
Species recognized as of October 2019:

(A * means that the newt has been moved into the genus Hypselotriton in some classifications )

Taxonomic controversy
The genus Cynops has been suggested to be due for a split, with the Chinese species being placed in a separate genus from the Japanese ones. The species Cynops cyanurus is at the centre of all this. There is much debate about the validity of C. cyanurus and C. chenggongensis. All the known captive animals could be something different from C. cyanurus, as they do not entirely match the original description of the species.  The only known animals that match that are animals originating from Chemnitz Zoo, but the F2 animals have not bred well, which could suggest they are in fact a hybrid of C. cyanurus and C. chenggongensis or an undescribed Cynops species.

References

External links

 
Amphibians of Asia